Ennis RFC, or Ennis Rugby Football Club, in an amateur rugby union club based on the Drumbiggle Road in Ennis, County Clare adjacent to the Ennis Showgrounds which has a ground capacity of up to 1,000.  The club often use the Clare County Council community facility at Lee's Road for training. The club currently plays in the Munster Junior League division 2.

History 
The club was formed in 1923. Players were primarily drawn from among the business community in the town. Many were also involved in the Past Pupils Union of St. Flannan's College. At the beginning of The Emergency (WWII), the club temporarily disbanded and did not reform until 1952. The Gaelic Athletic Association ban on their members playing any 'garrison games' discouraged people playing rugby if they also played hurling or Gaelic football. This affected the player base available to the club. An underage section was formed in 1973.

In 1979 the club finally built a clubhouse after purchasing land from the Showgrounds. The clubhouse is still in place today, having had a gym added subsequently.

As of 2008, the club fielded teams at various levels: Senior,
Senior 2nds,
U-19's,
U-17's,
U-15's,
U-14's,
U-13's,
U-12's,
U-11's,
U-10's,
U-9's,
U-8's.

The club had several successes with underage players selected for Munster and Ireland at a number of age levels in the early 2000s.

Honours 
 1928 Daresbury Cup

 1932 Garryowen Cup

 1976/77 The Kenny Shield

 1977/78 Banner Shield

 1978/79 Limerick City Cup

 2006 Liam Fitzgerald Cup

References

External links
 Ennis RFC
 Munster Rugby, ERFC contact details

Irish rugby union teams
Rugby union clubs in County Clare
Rugby clubs established in 1923
Ennis